Lim Jin-woo (born June 15, 1993) is a South Korean football player.

Career
Lim Jin-woo joined J2 League club Roasso Kumamoto in 2017.

He moves to Gwangju FC before 2019 season.

References

External links

1993 births
Living people
South Korean footballers
J2 League players
K League 2 players
Roasso Kumamoto players
Gwangju FC players
Association football defenders